Waterloo Square may refer to:

 Waterlooplein in Amsterdam 
 Waterloo Square in Batavia, Dutch East Indies, now Lapangan Banteng in Sawah Besar
 Waterloo Square in Waterloo, Ontario, Canada
 Waterloo Square in Hanover, Germany